Sklandrausis (Livonian dialect: sklandrouš, from Curonian: sklanda – 'fence-post, wattle fence, slope, declivity';  (plural: sūr kakūd), žograusis or dižrausis is a traditional Latvian dish of Livonian origin. It is a sweet pie, made of rye dough and filled with potato and carrot paste and caraway. In 2013 European Commission designated sklandrausis with a Traditional specialities guaranteed.

Ingredients 

The dough of sklandrausis is made from rye flour, butter, and water. The potato filling consists of potatoes, sour cream, egg, butter, and salt. The carrot filling consists of carrots, butter, sour cream, egg, and sugar.

Preparation 

Traditionally, the dough is cut in  rounds, then the edges of the dough are turned up. The dough is filled with a thin layer of potato filling, topped with a thicker layer of carrot filling, then baked. Sklandrausis are served with milk and honey or with skābputra (a fermented milk-and-barley gruel).

See also 
Karelian pasty

References

External links
 Sklandrausis Traditional Speciality Guaranteed specification . Official Journal of the European Union

Latvian cuisine
Livonians
Savoury pies
Rye-based dishes
Traditional Speciality Guaranteed products from Latvia